Linos Petridis (born 16 June 1961) is a Cypriot swimmer. He competed in the men's 100 metre butterfly at the 1980 Summer Olympics.

References

1961 births
Living people
Cypriot male swimmers
Olympic swimmers of Cyprus
Swimmers at the 1980 Summer Olympics
Commonwealth Games competitors for Cyprus
Swimmers at the 1978 Commonwealth Games
Place of birth missing (living people)
Male butterfly swimmers